Allan Linder (born 1966) is an American artist living in New York. He is a painter, sculptor, illustrator and writer. He uses a variety of media, but mostly acrylic paint on canvas.

Biography 
Linder was born in California in 1966, the great grandson of Italian immigrants. Linder has exhibited internationally in São Paulo, Brazil; Hamburg, Germany; Paris, France, and Barcelona, Spain. (Gunzelman 2007, p. 21). His work is held in private collections throughout the US and internationally. (Gunzelman 2007, p. 21).

His stepfather was in the military and Linder attended more than eight elementary schools around America. Between 1979 and 1995 he painted as Allan Shaw (Shaw was the name of his stepfather).

In the 1980s Linder was immersed in the art scene, and the growing rave scene in Los Angeles. In 2000 Allan split his time between Los Angeles and New York City, eventually settling in New York. He has exhibited at the “Artists' Gallery” in Chelsea.

References 
 Linder, A. (2013). Prisoner of the Mind, Vol. One. New York: Eloquent Press. 
 Gunzelman, T. (2009). Allan Linder Wandering Soul. New York: LULU Press. LCCN: 2007909251
 Gunzelman, T. (2007). Allan Linder 20th century and beyond. New York: LULU Press.

External links 
 http://www.allanlinder.com/
 The Artist's Gallery website
 Publishers website

Artists from Los Angeles
Living people
Sculptors from New York (state)
20th-century American painters
American male painters
21st-century American painters
21st-century American male artists
American landscape painters
1966 births
20th-century American sculptors
20th-century American male artists
American male sculptors
Sculptors from California